Ellis Morrison (May 20, 1850 – September 13, 1914) was an American politician who served as a member of the Washington House of Representatives, representing the 38th district from 1893 to 1897. From 1895 to 1897, he was the Speaker of that body.

References

Members of the Washington House of Representatives
1850 births
1914 deaths
19th-century American politicians